Eva Ahnert-Rohlfs (11 August 1912 – 9 March 1954) was a German astronomer. She made key observations of variable stars.

Eva Ahner-Rohlfs was born in Coburg (Duchy Saxe-Coburg-Gotha). She studied in Würzburg, Munich and Kiel from 1931 to 1933. After nine years of withdrawal into family life, she studied from 1942 until the end of the Second World War at the University of Göttingen. From 1945, she worked closely with professor Cuno Hoffmeister as an assistant astronomer at the Sonneberg Observatory. In 1951, she received a doctorate in astrophysics from the University of Jena. At Sonneberg Observatory Eva Rohlfs met the astronomer Paul Oswald Ahnert and they were married in 1952.

From the Sonneberg observatory he made important observations of the variable stars that he detailed in the article "Zur Struktur und Entstehung des Perseidenstroms" ("On the structure and origin of the Perseid current") included in the Observatory Publications Sonneberg Astronomical.

Eva Ahnert-Rohlfs died at the age of 41 in Sonneberg.

Bibliography 
 "Strahlungsdruck, Poynting-Robertson-Effekt und interstellare Materie." Mitteilung der Sternwarte Sonneberg 43 (1953)
 "Vorläufige Mitteilung über Versuche zum Nachweis von Meteoritischem Staub." Mitteilung der Sternwarte Sonneberg 45 (1954)
 "Zur Struktur der Entstehung des Perseidenstroms." Veröffentlichung der Sternwarte Sonneberg (part 2, p. 5–38) (1956)

Obituaries 
 AN 281 (1954) 284 (one sentence)
 Cuno Hoffmeister: "Eva Ahnert-Rohlfs" (Die Sterne issue 5/6, 1954, p. 103–105)

References 

1912 births
1954 deaths
20th-century German astronomers
Women astronomers
Ludwig Maximilian University of Munich alumni
University of Jena alumni
Academic staff of the University of Jena
German women academics
German women scientists
20th-century women scientists